The 2011 Latvian Figure Skating Championships was held in Riga from December 11 to 12, 2010. Skaters competed in the disciplines of men's singles and ladies' singles on the senior, junior, and novice levels.

Senior results

Men

Ladies

External links
 2011 Latvian Championships results

2010 in figure skating
2011 in figure skating